INS Utkrosh , is an Indian naval air station under the joint-services Andaman and Nicobar Command of the Indian Armed Forces. It is located near naval base INS Jarawa, on Port Blair in the Andaman & Nicobar Islands.

It shares airside facilities with Veer Savarkar International Airport which handles civilian traffic.

History 
The airfield at Port Blair was transferred from the Directorate General of Civil Aviation to the Indian Navy on 9 March 1984.  It was initially commissioned as INS Jarawa II.

On 11 May 1985, the air station was formally commissioned as INS Utkrosh by then Defence Minister of India, P. V. Narasimha Rao, making it the first naval air station in Andaman & Nicobar Islands. Its location makes it an important strategic station for protecting India's maritime interests in the Bay of Bengal. It also serves as an important facility for undertaking humanitarian operations, such as disaster relief and evacuation of medical emergencies from the remote islands.

The facilities at INS Utkrosh have been significantly upgraded. The runway has been lengthened to almost . Except for the civilian terminal operated by the Airports Authority of India, all other air traffic operations over Port Blair are undertaken by INS Utkrosh.
The geography makes this a difficult airfield for aircraft, as a hillock at one end means that planes can land or take off only in one direction. Winds change here every six months, so pilots have to either take off or land with strong tail winds.

Units
Naval Air Squadrons based at INS Utkrosh include:
 INAS 318, a reconnaissance squadron operating Dornier 228 aircraft
 INAS 321, operating HAL Chetak helicopters
 a Training squadron operating Pipistrel Alpha Trainer aircraft

See also
 Indian navy 
 List of Indian Navy bases
 List of active Indian Navy ships

 Integrated commands and units
 Armed Forces Special Operations Division
 Defence Cyber Agency
 Integrated Defence Staff
 Integrated Space Cell
 Indian Nuclear Command Authority
 Indian Armed Forces
 Special Forces of India

 Other lists
 Strategic Forces Command
 List of Indian Air Force stations
 List of Indian Navy bases
 India's overseas military bases

References

Utkrosh
Buildings and structures in the Andaman and Nicobar Islands